

Gmina Czerwionka-Leszczyny is an urban-rural gmina (administrative district) in Rybnik County, Silesian Voivodeship, in southern Poland.

The gmina contains part of the protected area called Rudy Landscape Park.

Villages
Apart from the town of Czerwionka-Leszczyny, Gmina Czerwionka-Leszczyny contains the villages and settlements of Bełk, Książenice, Palowice, Przegędza, Stanowice and Szczejkowice.

Neighbouring gminas
Gmina Czerwionka-Leszczyny is bordered by the towns of Knurów, Orzesze, Rybnik and Żory, and by the gminas of Ornontowice and Pilchowice.

Twin towns – sister cities

Gmina Czerwionka-Leszczyny is twinned with:
 Cacica, Romania
 Dubno, Ukraine
 Jēkabpils, Latvia
 Sokołów Podlaski, Poland

References

Czerwionka-Leszczyny
Gmina Czerwionka Leszczyny